Kurtis Taniela Haiu (14 July 1984 – 13 April 2016) was a New Zealand rugby union player who played for Blues in Super Rugby and represented Auckland in the Air New Zealand Cup.

Career

Representative Rugby
Haiu represented New Zealand at Secondary Schools, under 19 and under 21 level before beginning his professional rugby career.

ITM Cup
Haiu made his debut for Auckland in 2005 against the touring British and Irish Lions, a game Auckland lost 13–17. He has continued to represent Auckland, and was given captaincy duties on occasion.

Super Rugby
2006 saw Haiu make his Super 14 debut off the bench for the Blues in their season opening 19–37 loss to the Hurricanes at Eden Park. His first start for the Blues came in the Round 7 loss to the New South Wales Waratahs where he was given the task of marking Wycliff Palu. That same season Haiu scored his first try in Super Rugby when he dotted down against the Cats at Ellis Park. He made 53 appearances until his retirement from the game in 2011.

Sarcoma
2011 saw Haiu take an indefinite leave from rugby after the discovery of a lesion on a rib. Located in his T8 rib, the lesion was found by CT imaging taken in mid April. Haiu had noticed rib pain for several months but attributed this to the contact involved in rugby. However the pain became more frequent needing the initiation of further tests, including bone tests, with the diagnosis being a rare form of bone cancer called Ewing's sarcoma.

Haiu died from Ewing's sarcoma in Manurewa on 13 April 2016.

References

External links 
 Auckland player profile
 Blues player profile

1984 births
2016 deaths
New Zealand rugby union players
Blues (Super Rugby) players
Auckland rugby union players
Rugby union locks
People educated at Sacred Heart College, Auckland
Deaths from bone cancer
Deaths from cancer in New Zealand
Rugby union players from Whangārei